Korsnäs may refer to:

 Korsnäs AB, a company based in Sweden
 Korsnäs, Finland, a municipality and town in Ostrobothnia
 Korsnäs, Falun, a part of the town of Falun
 Korsnäs, Uppsala kommun, a small village in the Uppsala Municipality
 a residential area in the village of Östersundom in the municipality of Sipoo in Nyland
 a village in the municipality of Nagu in Åboland
 a village in the municipality of Sauvo in Finland Proper
 a village in the municipality of Vehmaa in Finland Proper